Lacerda is a Portuguese language surname. Notable persons with that name include:

Alberto de Lacerda (1928–2007), Portuguese poet and radio presenter
Carlos Lacerda (1914–1977), Brazilian journalist and politician
Daniel Lacerda (born 1975), Canadian author
Edmar Lacerda da Silva (born 1982), Brazilian football striker
Edmar Halovskyi de Lacerda, Ukrainian-Brazilian footballer
Francisco de Lacerda (died 1798), Portuguese explorer
Genival Lacerda, Brazilian singer
João Baptista de Lacerda (1846–1915), Brazilian physician and  biomedical scientist
Leonardo Renan Simões de Lacerda (born 1988), Brazilian football central defender
Marcio Lacerda (born 1946), Brazilian politician
Maria Lacerda de Moura (1887–1945), Brazilian teacher, journalist, feminist, and anarchist
Osvaldo Lacerda (born 1927), Brazilian composer
Thiago Lacerda (born 1978), Brazilian actor

See also
Rodrigo Lacerda Ramos (born 1980), Brazilian footballer
Pontes e Lacerda, a municipality in the Brazilian state of Mato Grosso

Portuguese-language surnames